Hasvik Church is a parish church of the Church of Norway in Hasvik Municipality in Troms og Finnmark county, Norway. It is located in the village of Hasvik. It is the church for the Hasvik parish which is part of the Alta prosti (deanery) in the Diocese of Nord-Hålogaland. The white, wooden church was built in an octagonal style in 1955 using plans drawn up by the architect Valdemar Scheel Hansteen. The church seats about 220 people.

History
The earliest existing historical records of the church date back to the year 1589, but the church was not new that year. In 1690, the old church was in poor condition so repairs were undertaken, however, two years later in 1692, the old church was torn down and replaced with a new church on the same site. The new church was a rectangular timber-framed building. The new church building quickly fell into disrepair.

In 1814, this church served as an election church. Together with more than 300 other parish churches across Norway, it was a polling station for elections to the 1814 Norwegian Constituent Assembly which wrote the Constitution of Norway. This was Norway's first national elections. Each church parish was a constituency that elected people called "electors" who later met together in each county to elect the representatives for the assembly that was to meet in Eidsvoll later that year.

In 1861, the old church was torn down and replaced with a new church building that was designed by the architect Christian Heinrich Grosch. In 1944, as the retreating German army was leaving Hasvik, they burned the church to the ground. The church was rebuilt in 1955 in an octagonal design. It was consecrated on 17 July 1955.

See also
List of churches in Nord-Hålogaland

References

Hasvik
Churches in Finnmark
Wooden churches in Norway
Octagonal churches in Norway
20th-century Church of Norway church buildings
Churches completed in 1955
15th-century establishments in Norway
Norwegian election church